Sphingopyxis is a bacterial genus.

References

Sphingomonadales
Bacteria genera